The 2009 East Asian Games, officially known as the V East Asian Games, was an international multi-sport event that hosted by Hong Kong, China, between 5 December and 13 December 2009. A total of 2,377 athletes from 9 East Asian national competed in 262 events in 22 sports. It was the biggest sporting event ever held in the territory.

Organisation

Bid 
In 2003 Hong Kong, Chinese Taipei and Mongolia entered the bidding process as potential host cities for the 5th East Asian games. Mongolia subsequently withdrew. On 3 November 2003 at a meeting in Macau, Hong Kong was selected as the host.

June 2004 saw the formation of the Preparatory Committee for the Hong Kong East Asian Games, chaired by Timothy Fok, president of Sports Federation and Olympic Committee of Hong Kong.

Costs 
On 13 January 2006 the Legislative Council had approved the government spending of HK$123 million for the games. The total expenditure for the games is estimated to be HK$240 million. The estimated total revenue is also HK$240 million, including HK$123 million government funding, HK$43 million from ticket and merchandise sales and HK$74 million from cash sponsorship.

Venues 

 Kowloon Park Swimming Pool: Aquatics (Swimming, Diving)
 Tseung Kwan O Sports Ground: Athletics, Bodybuilding, Cycling (Indoor Cycling)
 Queen Elizabeth Stadium: Badminton, Table-tennis
 Hong Kong Coliseum: Basketball, Volleyball
 Western Park Sports Centre: Basketball, Wushu (Taolu, Sanshou)
 Hong Kong International Trade & Exhibition Centre: Bowling, Cue Sports, DanceSport
 Gin Drinker's Bay, Kwai Chung: Cycling (BMX)
 Public Roads in the New Territories: Cycling (Road Cycling)
 Hong Kong Stadium: Football, Rugby Sevens
 Siu Sai Wan Sports Ground: Football
 King's Park Hockey Ground: Hockey
 Shek Kip Mei Park Sports Centre: Judo, Taekwondo
 Shatin Rowing Centre: Rowing
 South China AA Sports Complex: Shooting
 Hong Kong Squash Centre: Squash
 Aberdeen Tennis and Squash Centre: Squash
 Hong Kong Park Sports Centre: Squash
 Victoria Park Tennis Centre: Tennis
 Lai Chi Kok Park Sports Centre: Weightlifting
 Stanley Main Beach Water Sports Centre: Windsurfing

Emblem 
During the 2005 East Asian Games in Macau, a competition was held to determine the logo for the 5th East Asian Games. On 11 July 2005 a fireworks emblem, designed by Clement Yick Tat-wa, was selected. The design makes reference to the five Olympic rings, and the sparkling fireworks symbolise the energy of athletes striving to fulfill their potential and to achieve sporting excellence.

Slogan 
A slogan contest was held at the Asian Games in 2006 and the winning suggestion was "Be the Legend"; fitting well with the ideals of athletes reaching their potential and achieving legendary victories. This slogan was submitted by secondary school student Choi Sau-chu (蔡秀珠). The event song is You are the Legend.

Mascot 

"Dony" and "Ami", carrying the motifs of a flaming torch and the Lion Rock, were the mascots of the Games.

Stamps 
A set of "Heartwarming Stamps" were released in March and another set was available in August while commemorative stamps were issued on the opening day of the event, 5 December.

Countdowns

One year 
The 1 year countdown to the 2009 East Asian games began with Hong Kong Chief executive Donald Tsang inaugurating a special countdown clock in Hong Kong Cultural Centre on 5 December 2008. The ceremony was also attended by chairman of the East Asian Games planning committee Timothy Fok and heads of delegations of the nine countries. The countdown clock is based on the Mascot "Dony". The Cantonese version of the theme song You are the Legend was also performed for the first time by 30 Hong Kong singers including Alan Tam. Representatives of the Hong Kong 18 district councils were also present. For the 300-day countdown, 24 athletes were invited to sing the theme song at the Alan Tam Hacken Lee concert.

200 days 
A flower show was opened to the public on 13 May at Victoria Park. The show lasted 10 days featuring 60,000 pots of themed flower. Around 200 organizations from 20 countries participated in the show. The new Tseung Kwan O Sports Ground was opened on 19 May to celebrate the 200 days count down. A relay race was held between the HK police, HK immigration department, Leisure and Cultural department, HK Fire service, Customs and Exercise department, Hong Kong University of Science and Technology and Sai Kung District sports association. There was a dragon and lion dance performance and a tree planting ceremony. A cheerleading competition was also held.

Torch relay 

A torch relay was held on August 29 as part of the 100-day Countdown. The relay held the theme "Light the way to the EAG". The torch is a curvy cylinder with a square top and round bottom. It resembles the horn of an ox as 2009 is the year of the Ox. They create the patterns of "Lucky Clouds" to put forward the concept of yin and yang. This also convey the message that Hong Kong is a place where the Chinese and Western cultures meet.

Calendar 
In the following calendar for the 2009 East Asian Games, each blue box represents an event competition, such as a qualification round, on that day. The yellow boxes represent days during which medal-awarding finals for a sport were held.

Games

Opening ceremony 

State Councilor Liu Yandong graced the official opening ceremony on December 5, which featured an extensive firework display and a large scale music and dance performance at Hong Kong Cultural Centre section of Victoria Harbour. IOC President Jacques Rogge and some IOC members also attended the ceremony. Donald Tsang, Chief Executive of Hong Kong, in his speech said in part: "Through sport, we will celebrate the cultural diversity, friendship and indomitable spirit of our region. Hong Kong extends the hand of friendship to all our guests and visitors." Following this, the torch was brought into Victoria Harbour and the cauldron was lit, signalling the climax of the opening ceremony.

Sports 
2009 East Asian Games featured 262 events in 22 sports (including 16 Olympics sports), a new record of East Asian Games history.

 
 Swimming (40)
 Diving (10)
 
 
 
 †

 †
 
 Road Cycling (3)
 BMX (2)
 Indoor Cycling (5)
 †
 
 

 
 
 †
 
 †
 
 

 
 
 
 
 †
 Taolu (12)
 Sanshou (7)

NB: † = Non-Olympic sports

Closing ceremony 

The closing ceremony took place on 13 December at Kowloon Hong Kong Coliseum. After the country entrances, the event featured a host of performance art section on stage and the transfer of the East Asian Games flag to the host of the next host Tianjin. Three sections including Color, Flower and Ocean were on display along with a host of international popstars.

Medal table 
A total of 262 gold medals are presented in East Asian Games. The following table shows the Final Medal Tally of regions:

Participation 

All of the 9 East Asian Games Association (EAGA) that existed as of 2009 participated in the 2009 East Asian Games. China had the largest team, with 474 athletes.

References

External links 
 Official Site

 
East Asian Games
E
E
Multi-sport events in Hong Kong
East Asian Games